"Loosen Up My Strings" is a song co-written and recorded by American country music artist Clint Black.  It was released in August 1998 as the fifth single from his album Nothin' but the Taillights.  It peaked at #12 in the United States, and #6 in Canada.  The song was written by Black and Hayden Nicholas.

Content
The song is a blue-collar lyric about leaving the 9-to-5 work cycle and having fun.

Charts
"Loosen Up My Strings" debuted at number 57 on the U.S. Billboard Hot Country Singles & Tracks for the week of August 15, 1998.

Year-end charts

References

1998 singles
1997 songs
Clint Black songs
Songs written by Clint Black
Songs written by Hayden Nicholas
RCA Records singles
Song recordings produced by Clint Black
Song recordings produced by James Stroud